Chen Yang (born 15 February 1997) is a Chinese field hockey player for the Chinese national team.

She participated at the 2018 Women's Hockey World Cup.

References

External links
 

1997 births
Living people
Chinese female field hockey players
Youth Olympic gold medalists for China
Field hockey players at the 2020 Summer Olympics
Olympic field hockey players of China
21st-century Chinese women